Borlești is a commune in Neamț County, Western Moldavia, Romania. It is composed of five villages: Borlești, Nechit, Mastacăn, Ruseni, and Șovoaia.

Natives
 Ștefan Vârgolici

References

Communes in Neamț County
Localities in Western Moldavia